The United Arab Emirates national under-20 football team is the national football youth team of United Arab Emirates and is controlled by the United Arab Emirates Football Association.

Competitive record

FIFA U-20 World Cup

AFC U-19 Championship

U-20 Arab Cup

Individual awards
All Emiratis players who have won many individual awards With the UAE Under-20.

FIFA U-20 World Cup

AFC U-19 Championship

Asian Young Footballer of the Year

Matches

Recent results and fixtures

Coaches

Current squad
Source:

Former squads 
2009 FIFA U-20 World Cup squads
2003 FIFA under-20 World Cup squads - UAE
1997 FIFA under-20 World Cup squads - UAE

References

External links 
United Arab Emirates Football Association (Arabic)
UAE U20 Official Site (English)

See also 
United Arab Emirates national football team
United Arab Emirates national under-17 football team
United Arab Emirates national under-20 football team results

Asian national under-20 association football teams
under-20